Röhr is a river of North Rhine-Westphalia, Germany. It is a left tributary of the Ruhr river, itself a tributary of the Rhine. It flows into the Ruhr in Arnsberg-Hüsten.

It has the following main tributaries:
The Sorpe is a left tributary stream of the Röhr, in Hochsauerlandkreis.
The Linnepe is a right tributary stream of the Röhr, also in Hochsauerlandkreis.

See also
Sorpe Dam
List of rivers of North Rhine-Westphalia

References

Rivers of North Rhine-Westphalia
Rivers of Germany